"Atomic Dog" is a song by George Clinton from his 1982 album Computer Games. The track was released as a single in December 1982 and became the P-Funk collective's last to reach #1 on the U.S. R&B Chart. The single failed to chart on the Billboard Hot 100 although it has attained a level of stature since then, partly due to its having been sampled in several hip hop songs.

History
George Clinton's P-Funk reached its commercial and conceptual height during the late 1970s after the release of Mothership Connection and a series of spectacular concert tours. Each of these concerts ended with a climactic descent of a giant spaceship from the rafters. However, as the band and their concept of funk grew, the organization became entangled in internal dissension, legal disputes, and creative exhaustion. "Atomic Dog" was the P-Funk collective's last single to reach #1 on the U.S. R&B chart.

According to Clinton, most of the song's lyrics were ad-libbed during the recording process.

Critical reception and charts
Although "Atomic Dog" is now regarded a classic in black popular music, it was at first held back from radio stations. George Clinton's bad reputation in the industry, his political consciousness (as seen in his previous albums and recordings), as well as a general move towards more youthful-looking acts, kept his songs from being circulated on radio stations. Only after very strong sales was the song finally put on the air. The single "Atomic Dog" was released in December 1982 and reached #1 on the R&B charts, but missed the Hot 100 by just one position.

The song's music video was nominated two Billboard Video Music Awards, one for best special effects, and another for best art direction. However, the video lost to Billy Joel's "Pressure" and Herbie Hancock's "Rockit" respectively.

Filmography
The song has been included in trailers and TV spots for many films (many dog-related), including 101 Dalmatians, 102 Dalmatians, Rugrats Go Wild, Hotel for Dogs, The Shaggy Dog, Finn on the Fly, Legally Blonde 2: Red, White & Blonde, The Fresh Prince of Bel-Air, Boomerang, Scooby-Doo (2002), Menace II Society, and Trolls World Tour.

In popular culture
Snoop Dogg sampled the song in his 1993 song What's My Name?, mainly the chorus.

The song is also used during timeouts of New York Liberty basketball games, during which the team's canine mascot Maddie will pump up the home crowd by dancing to the song.

The song appears in a 2019 TV commercial for Etrade.

Since its release the song has also been widely popular with the Omega Psi Phi Fraternity, Inc. and is their favorite song to ‘hop’ to.

Copyright lawsuit
"Atomic Dog" was the subject of Bridgeport Music, Inc. v. UMG, Inc., et al. (Case No. 07-5596, 6th Cir. 2009), a lawsuit filed in 2007 by the holders of the composition rights to "Atomic Dog" against the producers of "D.O.G. in Me," a song recorded by the R&B and hip-hop group Public Announcement and included on their 1998 album, All Work, No Play. In its complaint, Bridgeport claimed that "D.O.G. in Me" infringed its copyright by repeating the phrase, "Bow wow wow, yippie yo, yippie yea" and the sound of rhythmic panting throughout the song, and by repeating the word "dog" in a low tone of voice at regular intervals as a form of musical punctuation. A jury found that the defendants had willfully infringed Bridgeport's rights and awarded statutory damages of $88,980. In a November 2009 decision affirming the lower court ruling, Circuit Judge Martha Craig Daughtry of the U.S. Court of Appeals for the Sixth Circuit described the circumstances surrounding the creation of "Atomic Dog":

 Songwriters David Spradley, Garry Shider, and George Clinton created "Atomic Dog" in a recording studio in January 1982, working without a written score... Testimony at trial indicated that the song was composed spontaneously – Spradley recorded the initial tracks in the studio and recalled that "when George arrived he had been partying pretty heavily so he was, you know, feeling pretty good," and was unsteady at the microphone. Spradley and Garry Shider "got on either side of him. We just kind of kept him in front of the microphone" while Clinton recorded the vocal tracks that same night... Testimony by David Spradley... also demonstrated that Clinton exercised some degree of creative control over the panting by instructing the performers to create a certain rhythm.

The court further described the "Bow Wow refrain" as the best-known aspect of the song – "in terms of iconology, perhaps the functional equivalent of 'E.T. phone home'" – and held that the jury did not act unreasonably in concluding that there was substantial similarity between the two works.

References

Bulmer, John. Devil Music: Race, Class, and Rock And Roll. Troy, New York: Russell Sage College Press.
Friedman, Ted. "Making it Funky: The Signifyin(g) Politics of George Clinton's Parliafunkadelicment Thang".1993.
Vincent, Rickey. Funk: The Music, The People, and the Rhythm of One. New York: St. Martin's Press, 1996. .

External links
[ Song Review] at Allmusic
Songs That Sample "Atomic Dog"

1982 singles
1982 songs
George Clinton (funk musician) songs
Songs written by George Clinton (funk musician)
Capitol Records singles
Electronica songs
Songs written by Garry Shider
Songs about dogs